is a Japanese-registered whale catcher that undertakes whaling operations in the North Pacific Ocean and Southern Ocean.  Along with other vessels of the Japanese whaling fleet, she has been featured on American television since 2008, in the documentary-style reality series Whale Wars.

Sea Shepherd confrontations 

On January 15, 2008, two members of the Sea Shepherd Conservation Society, traveling on the MV Steve Irwin, boarded the Yūshin Maru No. 2 without permission. They were detained on board the ship for two days before being transferred to the Australian customs vessel MV Oceanic Viking.

On February 6, 2009, the MV Steve Irwin collided with the Yūshin Maru No. 2 as the activist vessel attempted to obstruct the transfer of a whale up the slipway of the factory ship Nisshin Maru. Both sides claimed the other responsible. Pete Thomas of the LA Times speculated as to "whether [Mr. Watson's] actions are truly on behalf of the whales, or merely to obtain dramatic footage for the Animal Planet series, Whale Wars".

On January 15, 2017, the Yushin Maru No. 2 was again found fishing for whales within the Australian Whale Sanctuary by the Sea Shepherd. As the Sea Shepherds scouting helicopter flew overhead, Japanese whalers scrambled to cover a dead Antarctic Minke Whale.

See also
 Institute of Cetacean Research
 Whaling in Japan

References

Whaling ships
Whaling in Japan
2002 ships
Ships built in Japan